Walnut Hill Plantation was a small cotton plantation of  located in northern Leon County, Florida, United States owned by Thomas Anderson Bradford.

Location
Walnut Hill was located in the general area of Bradfordville near William Bradford's Edgewood Plantation, and Edward Bradford's Pine Hill Plantation, and Richard H. Bradford's Water Oak Plantation.

Plantation specifics
The Leon County Florida 1860 Agricultural Census shows that Pine Hill Plantation had the following:
 Improved Land: 
 Unimproved Land: 
 Cash value of plantation: $12,000
 Cash value of farm implements/machinery: $600
 Cash value of farm animals: $3700
 Number of slaves: 65
 Bushels of corn: 2500
 Bales of cotton: 80

Owner
Thomas Anderson Bradford was born February 13, 1790, in Enfield, North Carolina. Thomas had a daughter, Sallie G. Bradford born in 1835 and died in 1867.

References
Rootsweb Plantations
Largest Slaveholders from 1860 Slave Census Schedules
Paisley, Clifton; From Cotton To Quail, University of Florida Press, c1968.

Plantations in Leon County, Florida
Cotton plantations in Florida